KLPF (1180 AM) is a radio station  broadcasting a Christian radio format.  It is the flagship station of the Guadalupe Radio Network, which provides Catholic religious radio programming to several radio stations in the United States. Licensed to Midland, Texas, United States. The station, established in 1950, is currently owned by the La Promesa Foundation.

KLPF had been granted an FCC construction permit to move to a different transmitter site, change frequency from 1150 kHz to 1180 kHz, and increase day power to 25,000 watts and night power to 215 watts. The license to operate at this transmitter was issued on October 13, 2016.

History
Known as KJBC since it was founded in 1950, the station was assigned call sign KVDG on October 1, 2007.  On January 31, 2008, the station changed its call sign to KLPF.

References

External links

LPF
Catholic radio stations
LPF
Radio stations established in 1950
1950 establishments in Texas